Sybra moczari is a species of beetle in the family Cerambycidae. It was described by Breuning in 1981.

References

moczari
Beetles described in 1981